Mohamed Azzam (born 13 February 1990) is a Maldivian professional footballer who plays for TC Sports Club.

International
Azzam was first called up for Maldives national football team in March 2017 for 2019 AFC Asian Cup qualification match against Palestine at home, but was on bench as an unused substitute. He made his debut against Oman on 10 October 2017, in the 2019 AFC Asian Cup qualification match. He came in as a 70th-minute substitute for Naiz Hassan.

References

External links
 
 Azzam Mohamed at worldfootball.com

1990 births
Living people
Maldivian footballers
Association football defenders
Association football midfielders
Maldives international footballers
T.C. Sports Club players